The 1960 Rio de Janeiro mid-air collision was an aerial collision between two aircraft over Rio de Janeiro, Brazil on February 25, 1960. A United States Navy Douglas R6D-1 (DC-6A) (BuNo 131582) flying from Buenos Aires-Ezeiza to Rio de Janeiro-Galeão Air Force Base collided over Guanabara Bay, close to the Sugarloaf Mountain, with a Real Transportes Aéreos Douglas DC-3, registration PP-AXD, operating flight 751 from Campos dos Goytacazes to Rio de Janeiro-Santos Dumont Airport. The crash occurred at 16:10 local time at an altitude of 1,600 meters (5,249 feet).

The US Navy aircraft was carrying members of the United States Navy Band to Brazil to perform at a diplomatic reception attended by US President Dwight D. Eisenhower.  Of the 38 occupants of the American aircraft, 3 survived. All 26 passengers and crew of the Brazilian aircraft died.  The probable causes of the accident are disputed, but include human error, both air and ground, and faulty equipment.

References

United States Navy in the 20th century
Aviation accidents and incidents in 1960
Aviation accidents and incidents in Brazil
Mid-air collisions
Mid-air collisions involving airliners
Mid-air collisions involving military aircraft
Accidents and incidents involving the Douglas C-47 Skytrain
Accidents and incidents involving the Douglas DC-6
Aviation accident investigations with disputed causes
Real Transportes Aéreos accidents and incidents
1960 in Brazil
February 1960 events in South America